Egypt has been participating in the Paralympic Games since 1972, and has participated in every edition of the Summer Games since then.

History 
Egypt was involved very early in the Paralympic movement.  Egyptians were participating in the Stoke-Mandeville Games by 1954. Historically, the Egyptian Paralympic Committee has invested in very few sports.  These include on the team side wheelchair basketball, football for the deaf, goalball and sitting volleyball.  On the individual sport side, they have historically supported powerlifting, swimming, athletics and table tennis.  Archery, cycling, shooting and lawn bowls are supported only at the national level, not the international level.

Medals

Medals by Summer Games

Medals by Winter Games

Medals by Summer Sport

Medals by Winter Sport

See also
 Egypt at the Olympics

References

 
Parasports in Egypt